Atlantis is a live album by jazz pianist McCoy Tyner released on the Milestone label. It was recorded at the Keystone Korner in San Francisco on August 31 and September 1, 1974, and features Tyner in performance with saxophonist Azar Lawrence, bassist Juini Booth, drummer Wilby Fletcher and percussionist Guilherme Franco.

Reception 

Scott Yanow, writing for Allmusic, notes that "Tyner creates some very powerful and highly original solos, really tearing into some of the more extended pieces... Essential music that still sounds fresh and adventurous".  Richard Cook and Brian Morton, authors of The Penguin Guide to Jazz, opine that the both Enlightenment and Atlantis are "two huge, sprawling concert recordings which will drain most listeners: Tyner's piano outpourings seem unstoppable, and Lawrence comes on as an even fierier spirit than Fortune, even if both are in thrall to Coltrane."

Track listing

Recorded on August 31 (tracks 3, 5) and September 1, 1974 (tracks 1, 2, 4 and 6).

Personnel
McCoy Tyner - piano
Azar Lawrence - tenor saxophone, soprano saxophone (tracks 1, 3, 4, 5 and 6)
Joony Booth - bass (tracks 1, 3, 5 and 6)
Wilby Fletcher - drums (tracks 1, 3, 5 and 6)
Guilherme Franco - percussion (tracks 1, 3, 4, 5 and 6)

References

Albums produced by Orrin Keepnews
1975 live albums
McCoy Tyner live albums
Milestone Records live albums
Albums recorded at Keystone Korner